Francisco Guerrero y Palomares (1811 – 13 July 1851) was a Californio politician and ranchero, who served as the third and sixth Alcalde of San Francisco (then known as Yerba Buena). He was notoriously murdered in 1851 in a scandal involving American prospectors seeking to discredit the land claims of Californios.

Life
Guerrero was born in Tepic, New Spain (colonial México). He came to Alta California with the Hijar-Padres Colony in 1834, and settled in Yerba Buena (San Francisco). He was married to Josefa de Haro (daughter of Alcalde Francisco de Haro), and had five sons.

He was the third Alcalde of Yerba Buena in 1836.  Guerrero served again as the sixth Alcalde in 1839.

In 1844 he was granted Rancho Corral de Tierra, located in present-day San Mateo County, California. A section of the land grant is now a part of the Golden Gate National Recreation Area.

Francisco Guerrero was murdered in 1851 by Francis LeBras, in American San Francisco. He is buried at the Mission Dolores cemetery in the City.

Guerrero Street in San Francisco is named in his honor.

See also
Californios
List of pre-statehood mayors of San Francisco
Ranchos of California

References

Californios
People of Mexican California
Mayors of San Francisco
Mexican people of the Mexican–American War

1811 births

1851 deaths
Murdered Mexican Americans
People murdered in California
History of San Francisco
People from Tepic
19th-century American politicians
1851 murders in the United States
Burials at Mission San Francisco de Asís